Stephen Guppy (born February 10, 1951 in Nanaimo, British Columbia) is a Canadian writer. He is most noted for his short story "Downwind", which was a shortlisted finalist for the Journey Prize in 1998, and his poetry collection Understanding Heaven, which was shortlisted for the Dorothy Livesay Poetry Prize in 2002.

A graduate of the University of Victoria, he was a longtime professor of creative writing and journalism at Vancouver Island University until his retirement.

Works

Poetry
Ghostcatcher (1979)
Blind Date with the Angel: The Diane Arbus Poems (1998)
Understanding Heaven (2001)

Short story collections
Another Sad Day at the Edge of the Empire (1985)
The Work of Mercy (2006)

Novels
The Fire Thief (2004)
Like I Care (2013)

Non-fiction
Writing and Workshopping Poetry: A Constructive Introduction (2016)

References

1951 births
20th-century Canadian poets
20th-century Canadian short story writers
20th-century Canadian male writers
21st-century Canadian poets
21st-century Canadian short story writers
21st-century Canadian novelists
21st-century Canadian non-fiction writers
21st-century Canadian male writers
Canadian male poets
Canadian male short story writers
Canadian male novelists
Canadian male non-fiction writers
University of Victoria alumni
People from Nanaimo
Writers from British Columbia
Living people